The 2017 Amazonas gubernatorial special election was summoned by the Superior Electoral Court after the sentence that removed the Governor and Vice Governor of Amazonas from office, under the accusation of vote pairing. After that, the President of the Legislative Assembly of Amazonas assumed as Acting Governor until a new election could decide who would be the new head of Rio Negro Palace. Altogether, nine candidacies were registered for the voting. As none of them held more than 50% of the valid votes, a second round was held on 27 August with the two most voted candidates: Amazonino Mendes and Eduardo Braga. According to the Constitution, the new head of the state should complete the period commenced by his predecessor.

Candidates

Candidates in runoff

Candidates failing to make runoff

Candidacy denied

Debates

First round

Second round

Results

References

August 2017 events in South America
2017 elections in Brazil
Special elections in Brazil